Engelberg railway station is a Swiss railway station in the municipality of Engelberg in the canton of Obwalden. It is the terminus of the Luzern–Stans–Engelberg line, which is owned by the Zentralbahn railway company.

Services 
The following services stop at Dallenwil:

References

External links 
 

Railway stations in the canton of Obwalden
Engelberg
Zentralbahn stations